Eilidh;  is a Scottish Gaelic feminine given name. Although it is the equivalent of Ellie, it is usually anglicized as Helen.

Persons with the name include:

Eilidh Barbour, Scottish television presenter
Eilidh Doyle, British track and field athlete
Eilidh Gibson, Scottish slalom canoeist
Eilidh MacQueen, Scottish actress
Eilidh Mackenzie, Scottish singer and member of Mac-Talla
Eilidh McCreadie, Scottish radio drama director
Eilidh McIntyre, British sailor
Eilidh Middleton, Scottish equestrian
Eilidh Patterson, singer, songwriter
 Eilidh Shaw, Scottish fiddler
Eilidh Watt, Scottish Gaelic broadcaster and writer
Eilidh Whiteford, Scottish National Party politician

See also
Helensburgh, Argyll

References

Scottish Gaelic feminine given names